Richard Lourie is a historian and American foreign policy expert on Russia–United States relations, on which he consulted for Hillary Clinton in her failed 2008 presidential run.  He served as Gorbachev's translator, has written a fictional autobiography of Joseph Stalin, a biography of Andrei Sakharov, and a prognosticative biography Putin: His Downfall and Russia's Coming Crash, which explores the education and ascent of Putin during the dissolution of the USSR, and his career as Russia's autocrat, in order to estimate his probable future moves, while diagnosing Russia's spiritual ills and "narcissistic injuries" and "utter dependence on the ongoing will to power." 

He has translated over 30 books, and published articles and reviews in mainstream US media.

Selected publications

  introduction by Bruno Bettelheim
  ; Paperback, 1987.
   
 
 
 
  See also: Tony Wood (historian)

References

Living people
American historians
Year of birth missing (living people)
Place of birth missing (living people)
Russia–United States relations
Male biographers